The 2000 Cork Senior Football Championship was the 112th staging of the Cork Senior Football Championship since its establishment by the Cork County Board in 1887. The draw for the opening fixtures took place on 12 December 1999. The championship began on 16 April 2000 and ended on 1 October 2000.

University College Cork entered the championship as the defending champions, however, they were defeated by Castlehaven.

On 1 October 2000, Nemo Rangers won the championship following a 1-14 to 0-07 defeat of Carbery in the final. This was their 11th championship title overall and their first title since 1993.

Paul Holland from the Clyda Rovers club was the championship's top scorer with 2-40.

Team changes

To Championship

Promoted from the Cork Intermediate Football Championship
 Naomh Abán

From Championship

Regraded to the Cork Intermediate Football Championship
 Glanmire

Results

Preliminary round

First round

Round 2

The Cork Institute of Technology and Muskerry received byes in this round.

Round 3

Round 4

Quarter-finals

Semi-finals

Final

Championship statistics

Top scorers

Top scorers overall

Top scorers in a single game

Miscellaneous

Carrigdhoun recorded back-to-back victories for the first time in the history of the championship.
As a result of their victory in the final, Nemo Rangers joined the defunct Lees club at the top of the all-time roll of honour with 11 titles.
Carbery qualify for the final for the first time since 1974.

References

Cork Senior Football Championship
Cork Senior Football Championship